Grass Mountain may refer to:

 Grass Mountain (Vermont) (948 m), a mountain in Vermont, USA
 Grass Mountain (Benton County, Oregon) (1,099 m), a mountain in Oregon, USA
 Grass Mountain Chateau, a former presidential residence in China

See also 
 grass mountain